Erica Bartolina (née Boren) (born May 15, 1980 in Corvallis, Oregon) is an American pole vaulter. She set a personal best of 4.55 m by placing third at the 2008 U.S. Olympic Trials in Eugene, Oregon, which guaranteed her a qualifying place for the Olympics.

Career
Bartolina grew up on a sheep farm in Corvallis, Oregon. She lost her eyesight as a baby in a car accident, when a pair of scissors swiped across the dashboard during the collision, causing the injury and limiting her depth perception for life. Despite being blind in one eye, Bartolina did not stop her dream of becoming an Olympic athlete. She started her athletic career as a cross-country runner at age fourteen, until she was advised by her high school track coach Joe Fulton to try out for pole vault. Since then, Bartolina developed into one of the top pole vaulters in the state, and earned a full scholarship at Texas A&M University in College Station, Texas, where she won two Big 12 Conference titles, and also, held the distinction of being one of the school's first female pole vaulters.

Bartolina improved her marks in pole vault, when she finished ninth at the U.S. Olympic Trials in 2004, and fourth at the U.S. Indoor Championships in 2005. Shortly after the championships, Bartolina took a year off from pole vault, when she suffered a severe back injury from training at Texas A&M University. In 2008, she came out of recovery from injury, and competed at the U.S. Olympic Trials in Eugene, Oregon, where she successfully cleared a height and set a personal best of 4.55 metres in the women's pole vault. Finishing third from the trials and reaching an A-standard height of 4.45 metres, Bartolina automatically qualified for the Olympics.

At the 2008 Summer Olympics in Beijing, Bartolina competed as a member of the U.S. track and field team in the women's pole vault, along with her teammates April Steiner Bennett, and Jennifer Stuczynski, who eventually won the silver medal in the final. Unfortunately, she failed to clear a height of 4.30 metres in the preliminary rounds, after three unsuccessive attempts.

Bartolina currently resides in Hammond, Louisiana and is the owner of "The Louisiana Pole Vault Compound", a pole vault training facility. She coached high school athlete Devin King to a personal best height of 5.50m (18'0.5") at the 2014 World Junior Championships, and the high school indoor record of 5.45m (17'10.5").   In 2014, Bartolina married Doug Fraley, coach and former pole vaulter.

References

External links

NBC 2008 Olympics profile

1980 births
Living people
American female pole vaulters
Olympic track and field athletes of the United States
Athletes (track and field) at the 2008 Summer Olympics
Texas A&M University alumni
Texas A&M Aggies women's track and field athletes
Sportspeople from Corvallis, Oregon
Sportspeople from Hammond, Louisiana